Hans Menet (born 29 May 1940) is a Swiss middle-distance runner. He competed in the 3000 metres steeplechase at the 1968 Summer Olympics and the 1972 Summer Olympics.

References

1940 births
Living people
Athletes (track and field) at the 1968 Summer Olympics
Athletes (track and field) at the 1972 Summer Olympics
Swiss male middle-distance runners
Swiss male steeplechase runners
Olympic athletes of Switzerland
Place of birth missing (living people)